The Great Kilapy is a 2012 comedy-drama film directed by Zézé Gamboa. The film was an international co-production between companies in Angola, Brazil and Portugal.

Plot 
Joao Fraga is a young Angolan, the descendant of a rich family from the colonial period. This mestizo boy just wants to live his life, having fun with friends and spending his money. Although he is the Senior Executive of the National Bank of Angola, he diverts the institution's own funds, distributing money to colleagues and activists for the liberation of Angola. Joao goes to jail, but when he got out of prison, is upheld by society as a local hero.

References

External links
 

2012 films
Angolan drama films
Brazilian comedy-drama films
Portuguese comedy-drama films
Films shot in João Pessoa